Prince Irakli Konstantines dze Bagration of Mukhrani or Prince Irakli Konstantinovich Bagration-Mukhranski (1813-1892) was a Georgian nobleman of the House of Mukhrani.

Biography
Son of Constantine IV of Mukhrani or Prince Konstantiné Ioannovich Bagration-Mukhranski and wife Marié Khoreshan Guramishvili or Princess Maria Khoreshan Zaalovna Guramova (1786-1831).

In 1848 Irakli married Princess Ketevan Mkhardgrdzéli-Arghutashvili or Princess Ekaterina Ivanovna Argutinskaya-Dolgorukova (1813 - 1880?), daughter of Prince Ioann Mkhardgrdzéli-Arghutashvili or Prince Ivan Zakharievich Argutinsky-Dolgorukov and wife Princess Nina Tumanova, a relative of Prince Cyril Toumanoff. They were parents of eight children: 
 Barbare Bagration of Mukhrani (1848-1930)
 Sofia Bagration of Mukhrani (1850-1932)
 Ketevan Bagration of Mukhrani (1852-1918)
 Alexander Bagration of Mukhrani (1853-1918)
 Giorgi Bagration of Mukhrani (1854-1861)
 Tamar Bagration of Mukhrani (1855-1918)
 Levan Bagration of Mukhrani (1862-1888)
 Mikheil Bagration of Mukhrani (1865-1872)

References

 ბაგრატიონები - ლიტ.1 - ტაბ.8 - ერეკლე კონსტანტინეს ძე ბაგრატიონ-მუხრანსკი
 მუხრანბატონები - ლიტ.1 - ირაკლი კონსტანტინეს ძე ბაგრატიონ-მუხრანსკი
 "Burke's Royal Families of the World: Europe and Latin America"
 "Noble Families of the Russian Empire", Volume IV, The Princes of the Kingdom of Georgia

1813 births
1892 deaths
House of Mukhrani
Nobility of Georgia (country)